Wang Sun-Jae (born 19 March 1959) is a South Korean former footballer who plays as a forward. He is a current manager of Yanbian Beiguo.

In 1983, he was top scorer of Korean League 1983 (Semi-professional) and Hanil Bank won the trophy.

He was part of the South Korea national football team. He played at 1984 AFC Asian Cup, 1986 FIFA World Cup qualification.

Club career statistics

Coach & Manager Career 
 1992-1994 : Wonju Technical High School manager
 1998-2000 : Dong-A University
 2001 : Suwon Samsung Bluewings scout & Reserve team coach
 2002-2003 : Suwon Bluewings head coach
 2007. 1.-4. : Adap Galo Maringá Football Club manager
 2007. 8.- 2009. 6. : Daejeon Citizen head coach
 2009. 6.- 2011. 7. : Daejeon Citizen manager
 2018. 1.-  : Yanbian Beiguo manager

References

External links
 
 Wang Sun-jae – National Team stats at KFA 

1959 births
Living people
Association football forwards
South Korean footballers
South Korea international footballers
K League 1 players
FC Seoul players
Pohang Steelers players
Ulsan Hyundai FC players
Daejeon Hana Citizen FC managers
1984 AFC Asian Cup players
Expatriate football managers in China
South Korean expatriate football managers